Castle Hill Lighthouse is located on Narragansett Bay in Newport, Rhode Island at the end of the historic Ocean Drive. It is an active navigation aid for vessels entering the East Passage, between Conanicut Island and Aquidneck Island. The lighthouse has become a symbol of Newport, and a frequent site for wedding photos, proposals, and tourist photos. Although the property is owned by the nearby Castle Hill Inn, the lighthouse is owned by the United States Coast Guard.

History
Henry Hobson Richardson drew a sketch for a lighthouse at this location which may or may not have been the basis for the actual design. The structure does not include the residence which was featured in Richardson's sketch.  The keeper's house was built, and still stands, near Castle Hill Cove, a few hundred feet away.

The lighthouse was completed in 1890 on property formerly belonging to the naturalist, oceanographer, and zoologist Alexander Agassiz of Harvard University. Agassiz sold the land to the United States Government for the lighthouse for $1. His mansion on the property, commissioned in 1874, is now an inn. It was added to the National Register of Historic Places in 1988 as Castle Hill Lighthouse.

Although the lighthouse building is not open to the public, the shoreline and cliff face where the lighthouse sits are accessible by several footpaths from the Castle Hill Inn and the Castle Hill Cove Marina. The lighthouse is a popular site for tourist photos and wedding shoots, and widely recognizable as a symbol of Newport. While the property is owned by the nearby Castle Hill Inn, the lighthouse itself is owned  by the United States Coast Guard.

2021 repainting
By 2020, the iconic lighthouse had become streaked with unsightly brown rust, and the Coast Guard indicated that it had no plans to perform any exterior maintenance.

In March 2021, the Castle Hill Inn signed a five-year agreement with the Coast Guard to refresh the lighthouse's exterior appearance. A local contractor was hired to perform a full power wash, paint, and beautification at a cost of $17,000, just in time for the 2021 summer wedding season.

List of keepers 
 Frank W. Parmele (1890 – 1911)
 George L. Hoxsie (1911 – at least 1944)
 Manuel Soares Macedo (at least 1945).

See also
National Register of Historic Places listings in Newport County, Rhode Island

Further reading 

 Castle Hill Lighthouse at American Byways

References

External links
 Castle Hill Lighthouse Plans and Maps 1869 - 1896

Lighthouses completed in 1890
Lighthouses in Newport County, Rhode Island
Lighthouses on the National Register of Historic Places in Rhode Island
Henry Hobson Richardson buildings
Richardsonian Romanesque architecture in Rhode Island
Buildings and structures in Newport, Rhode Island
National Register of Historic Places in Newport, Rhode Island
Individually listed contributing properties to historic districts on the National Register in Rhode Island
1890 establishments in Rhode Island